Hair: Debatable is a live album by Atom and His Package. All the songs are written by Adam Goren unless otherwise indicated.

Track listing
 "Intro" – 1:58
 "(Lord It's Hard to Be Happy When You're Not) Using the Metric System" – 3:20
 "Pumping Iron For Enya" – 2:58
 "Possession (Not the One by Danzig)" – 2:49
 "Happy Birthday Ralph" – 2:22
 "Bloody Lip" – 0:38 (I Hate You cover)
 "Snowshoe BBQ" – 2:33
 "Upside Down From Here" – 2:58
 "Mustache T.V." – 2:10
 "Shopping Spree Introduction" – 3:04
 "Shopping Spree" – 4:12
 "Mind's Playing Tricks on Me" – 2:44 (Geto Boys cover)
 "If You Own the Washington Redskins, You're a Cock" – 2:09
 "Waiting Room" – 2:05 (Fugazi cover)
 "I'm Downright Amazed At What I Can Destroy With Just a Hammer" – 3:22
 "Anarchy Means I Litter" – 3:33
 "Undercover Funny" – 3:26
 "Head (She's Just A...)" – 2:16
 "What WE Do On Christmas" – 2:31
 "Collateral Damage" – 0:57 (Brutal Truth cover)
 "Me and My Black Metal Friends" – 2:36
 "Does Anyone Else In This Room Want to Marry His Or Her Own Grandmother?" – 2:43
 "Avenger" – 3:13
 "Hats Off to Halford" – 2:18
 "Meatball" – 1:59 (Downgirl cover)
 "Atom and His Package" – 3:15
 "Punk Rock Academy" – 3:12

References

2004 live albums
Adam Goren albums